Mao Fumei (9 November 1882 – 12 December 1939) was the first wife of Chiang Kai-shek, and the biological mother of Chiang Ching-Kuo.

Mao was born in Fenghua, Ningbo, Zhejiang Province, and, like most women of the era, she was illiterate. She married Chiang Kai-shek in an arranged marriage in 1901. When Chiang came back from Japan, he divorced her in 1921.

References

1882 births
1939 deaths
Chiang Kai-shek family
People from Ningbo
People killed in the Second Sino-Japanese War
Deaths by Japanese airstrikes
Deaths by airstrike during World War II
Spouses of Chinese politicians